Bowling Ball Beach is a part of Schooner Gulch State Beach, in Mendocino County, California, in the United States. It is named for the spherical sandstone concretions found there at low tide.

See also
 Caspar Headlands State Beach
 Glass Beach (Fort Bragg, California)
 Greenwood State Beach
 Moeraki Boulders

References 

 Bowling Ball Beach - Point Arena Merchant's Association
 Bowling Ball Beach - Atlas Obscura
 Bowling Ball Beach Mendocino - Weekend Sherpa

External links 

Beaches of Mendocino County, California
Beaches of Northern California